The 1938–39 Estonian Top Division was the 18th official football league season in Estonia. JS Estonia Tallinn won the title.

League table

Results

Top scorers

References

Estonian Football Championship
1939 in Estonian football
1938 in Estonian football
Estonia